Rabee Al-Mousa (born December 7, 1984), is a Saudi Arabian professional footballer who plays as a defender.

External links 
 

Living people
1984 births
Saudi Arabian footballers
Al Hilal SFC players
Najran SC players
Sdoos Club players
Al-Ahli Saudi FC players
Al-Taawoun FC players
Al-Faisaly FC players
Abha Club players
Al-Wehda Club (Mecca) players
Wej SC players
Al-Hejaz Club players
Saudi Second Division players
Saudi First Division League players
Saudi Professional League players
Association football defenders